Kise was an unincorporated community located in Lawrence County, Kentucky, United States.

In 1908, Kise had three stores, two mills, two blacksmith shops, and a court presided over by one Squire Berry.  In 1919, local farmers began to construct a lime shed at the Kise railroad siding.  Farmers in the area reported having excellent crops in 1917.

References

Unincorporated communities in Lawrence County, Kentucky
Unincorporated communities in Kentucky